A gu, or district, is an administrative unit in South Korea. There are two kinds of districts in South Korea. One is the autonomous district of special and metropolitan cities, which is a municipal entity similar to a city with its own mayor along with its own legislative council. The other is the non-autonomous district of municipal cities. Cities with over 500,000 people are allowed to have gu (notable exceptions to this rule are the cities of Gimhae, Hwaseong, and Namyangju).

See also
List of districts in South Korea
Administrative divisions of South Korea
District (China) the original use of the gu hanja, still in use in China and Taiwan

References